The Rescue Preparedness Medal (Danish: Redningsberedskabets Medalje) was instituted in 1994 by Queen Margrethe II and may be awarded to any member of the Danish Emergency Management Agency for participation in international humanitarian operations outside the borders of the Kingdom of Denmark.

The medal was created in 1994, but was awarded to persons who had participated in international operations after April 1, 1991.

Below is a list of known inscriptions:
 Afghanistan 1991
 Iran 1991
 Iraq 1991
 Sri Lanka 1991-1992
 Siberia 1991-1992
 St. Petersburg 1991
 The Baltics 1992
 Turkey 1992
 Somalia 1992
 Somalia 1993
 Afghanistan 1994
 Former Yugoslavia 1991
 Former Yugoslavia 1992
 Former Yugoslavia 1992-1993
 Former Yugoslavia 1993
 Former Yugoslavia 1993-1994
 Former Yugoslavia 1994
 Former Yugoslavia 1994-1995
 Former Yugoslavia 1995
 Romania 1992
 Bosna 1997
 Former Yugoslavia 1997-1998
 Liberia 1997-1998
 Albania 1999
 Kosovo 1999
 Macedonia 1999
 Kosovo 2001
 Afghanistan 2002
 Iran 2003
 Banda Aceh 2004
 Pakistan 2005
 Lebanon 2006
 Lebanon 2007
 Sumatra 2009
 Chile 2010
 Haiti 2010
 Albania 2010
 Pakistan 2010
 Sierra Leone 2014 - 2015

References

See also
 List of orders, decorations, and medals of the Kingdom of Denmark

Orders, decorations, and medals of Denmark